Rock n Roll Junkie  is a 1994 Dutch documentary film directed by Jan Eilander. The film is about Herman Brood.

Cast

External links 
 

1994 films
1990s Dutch-language films
1994 documentary films
Dutch documentary films
Herman Brood